The Ghana Red Cross Society, also known as GRCS, was founded in 1958. It has its headquarters in Accra, Ghana.

External links
 Ghana Red Cross Society Profile 
 Official Red Cross Web Site 

Red Cross and Red Crescent national societies
1958 establishments in Ghana
Organizations established in 1958
Medical and health organisations based in Ghana